The Connecticut Women's Hall of Fame (CWHF) recognizes women natives or residents of the U.S. state of Connecticut for their significant achievements or statewide contributions.

The CWHF had its beginnings in 1993 when a group of volunteers partnered with Hartford College for Women to establish an organization to honor distinguished contributions by female role models associated with Connecticut. The first list of inductees contained forty-one women notable to Connecticut's history and culture, many of whom broke down barriers by becoming the first women to establish themselves in fields that had been previously denied to their gender.   Alice Paul, who had a role in the passage of the Nineteenth Amendment to the United States Constitution and later wrote the first version of the proposed Equal Rights Amendment, was on the 1994 list of women. Also on that first list were actress Katharine Hepburn and her mother Katharine Martha Houghton Hepburn, who was a pioneer in women's rights and planned parenthood issues. Three of the Beecher clan are on that first list, Hartford Female Seminary founder Catharine Beecher, suffragist Isabella Beecher Hooker, and abolitionist author Harriet Beecher Stowe. Governor Ella T. Grasso was honored in 1994, as was Estelle Griswold, whose landmark Griswold v. Connecticut before the United States Supreme Court resulted in Connecticut's anti-birth control statute being declared unconstitutional.

In the ensuing two decades, the list has more than doubled. Artist Laura Wheeler Waring, who found fame by creating portraits of prominent African Americans during the Harlem Renaissance, was added in 1997. Abstract artist Helen Frankenthaler became part of the list in 2005. African American opera divas are on the list, Marian Anderson in 1994 and Rosa Ponselle in 1998. Ambassador, politician and playwright Clare Boothe Luce's 1994 appearance on the list was later joined by 19th century free black woman journalist Maria W. Stewart in 2001 and by war correspondent and human rights activist Jane Hamilton-Merritt in 1999.  In 2008, the list gained Nobel Prize in Medicine winner, geneticist Barbara McClintock. The Pulitzer Prize for General Non-Fiction winner Annie Dillard was added to the list in 1997.

The CWHF provides educational resources through two traveling exhibits, the Inductee Portrait Exhibit, and its We Fight For Roses, Too, a set of twenty-two standing panels displaying the stories of the inductees. The CWHF also provides speakers upon request.

Inductees

Footnotes

References

Further reading

External links
 Connecticut Women's Hall of Fame

Women's halls of fame
History of women in Connecticut
Lists of American women
State halls of fame in the United States
Halls of fame in Connecticut
Lists of people from Connecticut